Kimhyŏngjik County is a kun of Ryanggang Province, North Korea.  Formerly known as Huch'ang County, it was renamed in 1988 in honour of Kim Hyŏng-jik, the leader of the anti-Japanese liberation movement of Korea.

The 2004 Ryanggang explosion occurred at Wŏltal-lodongjagu in this county.

Geography
Kimhyŏngjik is located in the northwestern part of the Kaema Plateau.  It borders China to the north (Yalu River region).  Although the south is a plateau region, the Yalu River is in the north. The Hŭisaekpong and Rangrim mountain ranges are partly in this county. The highest peak is Hŭisaek-pong.  The region bordering on the Yalu River is mainly precipices. The main streams are the Yalu River and its tributaries. The county's land area is 93% forested.

Administrative divisions
Kimghyŏngjik county is divided into 1 ŭp (town), 6 rodongjagu (workers' districts) and 9 ri (villages):

Economy
Forestry is the main industry, taking up 50% of the industrial output. The main rivers are used to transport timber. Iron, gold, silver, copper, tungsten, graphite and nickel deposits are found in the county. Agriculture is also practised with the majority of it in Koup-rodongjagu, Rajung-ri, Yonpo-rodongjagu, Chukchol-ri and Woltal-rodongjagu, while rice paddies are mostly in Kimhyongjik-up, Muchang-ri, Koup-rodongjagu and Rajung-ri, along the Yalu River. Red pepper, corn, beans, potatoes, rice and flax are mainly produced. Sericulture is also practised. Most of corn and rice produced in Ryanggang Province are produced in this county.

There are various schools and healthcare facilities in the county. There is also a children's palace in the county.

The Huchang Mine No.4 power station started to be built on 25 July, 2021 and was completed on 23 September, 2021. The completion of the power plant allows the normalisation of production at the Huchang Mine.

Transportation
The Pukbunaeryuk Line of the Korean State Railway and various roads serve the county.

A road from Sinuiju to Uam-ri, Rason and a road from Kimhyonjik-up to Kanggye runs through the county.

See also
Geography of North Korea

External links

References

Counties of Ryanggang